The 30 cm Raketenwerfer 56 was a German multiple rocket launcher used in the Second World War. It served with units of the Nebeltruppen, the German equivalent of the U.S. Army's Chemical Corps. Just as the Chemical Corps had responsibility for poison gas and smoke weapons that were used instead to deliver high-explosives during the war so did the Nebeltruppen. The name "Nebelwerfer" is best translated as "Smoke Mortar". 694 saw service from 1944–45 in all theaters except Norway.

Description
The 30 cm Raketenwerfer 56 was a six-barreled rocket launcher mounted on the carriage of the 5 cm PaK 38 anti-tank gun. Its 30 cm Wurfkörper 42 Spreng (Explosive missile) rocket was spin-stabilized and electrically-fired. The rockets had a prominent exhaust trail that kicked up a lot of debris, so the crew had to seek shelter before firing. This meant that they were easily located and had to displace quickly to avoid counter-battery fire. The rockets were fired one at a time, in a timed ripple, but the launcher had no capability to fire single rockets. 15 cm Wurfgranate 41 rockets could be fired using liner rails. When not in use the rails were strapped to the top of the launcher.

The same rocket was used in the 30 cm Nebelwerfer 42 launcher.

Organization and use
The 30 cm Raketenwerfer 56 was organized into batteries of six launchers with three batteries per battalion. These battalions were concentrated in independent Werfer-Regiments and Brigades. It saw service on the Eastern Front, Italian Campaign and the defense of France and Germany from 1944–45.

See also
 30 cm Nebelwerfer 42

Notes

References 
 Englemann, Joachim and Scheibert, Horst. Deutsche Artillerie 1934-1945: Eine Dokumentation in Text, Skizzen und Bildern: Ausrüstung, Gliderung, Ausbildung, Führung, Einsatz. Limburg/Lahn, Germany: C. A. Starke, 1974
 Gander, Terry and Chamberlain, Peter. Weapons of the Third Reich: An Encyclopedic Survey of All Small Arms, Artillery and Special Weapons of the German Land Forces 1939-1945. New York: Doubleday, 1979 
 Kameradschaft der ABC-Abwehr, Nebel- und Werfertruppen e.V. Die Nebel- und Werfertruppe (Regimentsbögen). 2001

External links 
 Lexikon der Wehrmacht on Nebelwerfers (in German)
 YouTube video of different kinds of Nebelwerfers in action
 Germany's Rocket and Recoilless Weapons from the U.S. Intelligence Bulletin, March 1945

Rocket artillery
World War II artillery of Germany
300 mm artillery
Weapons and ammunition introduced in 1944